Claudette Bradshaw,  (April 8, 1949 – March 26, 2022) was a Canadian politician who served as Member of Parliament (MP) for the riding of Moncton—Riverview—Dieppe, New Brunswick. She was first elected on June 2, 1997, and served until the 2006 election. She was a member of the Liberal Party of Canada.

Claudette Bradshaw was appointed Parliamentary Secretary to the Minister for International Cooperation and Minister Responsible for the Francophonie on June 10, 1997. On November 23, 1998, she was appointed to cabinet as Minister of Labour. After being re-elected in November 2000, she was re-appointed Minister of Labour on January 15, 2002, and again on December 12, 2003. From  March 23, 1999, until July 20, 2004, she was the Federal Coordinator on Homelessness.

After the 2004 election, Prime Minister Paul Martin shuffled the cabinet, and demoted Bradshaw to the position of Minister of State (Human Resources Development). In November 2005, Bradshaw announced that she would not stand for re-election in the 2006 federal election.

Following her retirement from federal politics, there was some speculation that she would run for the provincial Liberals in the next New Brunswick election in the riding of Kent South.  Bradshaw later announced she was not interested in re-entering electoral politics but was appointed special advisor to leader Shawn Graham for that election campaign.

In 2009, she was appointed a member of the Order of New Brunswick. In 2020, she was awarded the Human Rights Award of the Province of Brunswick.

Bradshaw died on March 26, 2022, at the age of 72 from cancer.

Lifetime work 
In 1974, Claudette Bradshaw founded the Moncton Headstart Early Family Intervention Center.

References

External links
 
 How'd They Vote?: Claudette Bradshaw's voting history and quotes

1949 births
2022 deaths
Deaths from lung cancer in New Brunswick
Members of the House of Commons of Canada from New Brunswick
Liberal Party of Canada MPs
Members of the Order of New Brunswick
Members of the King's Privy Council for Canada
People from Moncton
Women members of the House of Commons of Canada
Women in New Brunswick politics
Canadian monarchists
Members of the 26th Canadian Ministry
Members of the 27th Canadian Ministry
Women government ministers of Canada
21st-century Canadian women politicians
20th-century Canadian women politicians